"Pussy" is a song by German Neue Deutsche Härte band Rammstein. It was released as the lead single from the band's sixth studio album, Liebe ist für alle da (2009) on 18 September 2009. The song was released with a controversial and sexually explicit music video in which the band members, portrayed by body-doubles during some of the close ups of specific body parts, are seen having sex with women.

The first promotional video for the single was released online on 16 September 2009 at the Gauntlet. The video also confirmed the new album title.

"Pussy" was Rammstein's first number one single in Germany. The song was remixed by Scooter, a fellow German artist, and the remix later appeared on the "Ich tu dir weh" single. It was the first Rammstein song to be released after their three-year hiatus.

Music video
The video was directed by Jonas Åkerlund and released online on 16 September 2009. The video features the band playing the song wearing leather outfits, interspersed with six hardcore pornographic videos featuring each of the band members as a different stereotypical pornographic character: Till as the playboy, Christoph as the CEO, Paul as the cowboy, Oliver as Mr. Pain (a BDSM fetishist), Richard as the party boy, and Flake as the shemale. Each scene features a band member engaging in foreplay with a different woman, and the scenes become more explicit as the video progresses until they engage into unsimulated sexual intercourse with graphic nudity. However, some body doubles were used. At the end of the video, the band members ejaculate.

Legal issues
On April 28, 2021, the former coordinator for the Arkhangelsk offices of anti-corruption politician Alexei Navalny, Andrei Borovikov was sentenced to 2.5 years for sharing the music video on VKontakte back in 2014. However, the charges were only issued six years after the initial posting and only then after the original post had been deleted and only seen by two of his closest friends. He was charged with breaking Article 242(3)(b), "production and distribution of pornography," a charge which is disputed to be politically motivated. Natalia Zviagina, the director of Amnesty International's Moscow office, described the charges as "utterly absurd" and clearly politically motivated. Previously, in September 2019 he was sentenced to 400 hours of community service over his involvement with peaceful, anti-landfill demonstrations, a violation of Article 212.1.

Lyrics
The lyrics are partially in English and deal with sex tourism with lines like "Alleine in das Ausland fahren" ("drive alone to a foreign country") and "I can't get laid in Germany". A mention of the Autobahn and the seemingly nonsensical line "Reise, Reise, Fahrvergnügen", are a reference to appearances of German culture in American commercialism (the latter from a Volkswagen advertising campaign, the former from one of Rammstein's own previous albums). Together, these aspects of the song create a contrast between the sexual mores of German society and that of America.

Live performances

"Pussy" debuted live, as most of Rammstein's songs, during fan exclusive concerts held in Berlin in October 2009. "Pussy" was the last song of the main set of the Liebe ist für alle da tour, and continues to be in the Made in Germany tour.

Track listings
CD

Vinyl

 The 7" vinyl edition only contains "Pussy".

Versions

Release history

Charts

Weekly charts

Year-end charts

References

Rammstein songs
2009 singles
Music videos directed by Jonas Åkerlund
Universal Music Group singles
Spinefarm Records singles
Macaronic songs
Number-one singles in Finland
Number-one singles in Germany
2009 songs
Music video controversies
Obscenity controversies in music